Lapta is a Russian bat and ball game first known to be played in the 14th century. Mentions of lapta have been found in medieval manuscripts, and balls and bats were found in the 14th-century layers during excavations in Novgorod. It is similar to cricket, brännboll, rounders, baseball, oină, tsan (Italy)  and pesäpallo.

Rules
The game is played outside on a field the size of half a football pitch 20 × 25 sazhens. There are five people on the field from the defending team, as well as pitcher/server. This pitcher server stands near the batter of the opposing team and hits a ball in the direction of the batter. The team that bats contains six people. Each hitter gets two chances to hit the ball over a 10m line. If they succeed at that, the runners can go to an endline at the other end of the pitch. If a player manages to run between the two endpoints, they get 2 points. A game lasts an hour, split into two equal halves.

The edges of the field are marked with parallel lines, called salo.

The goal of the game is to hit the ball, served by a player of the opposite team, with the bat and send the ball as far as possible, then run across the field to the kon line, and if possible to run back to the gorod line.

The running player tries to avoid being hit with the ball, which is thrown by the opposing team members. For successful runs, the team earns points. A team wins by either getting more points during the scheduled time or by having all its players complete runs.

A description of lapta is given by Aleksandr Kuprin: This folk game is one of the most interesting and useful games. Lapta requires resourcefulness, deep breathing, faithfulness to your group, attention, dexterity, fast running, good aiming and marksmanship, strong striking hands, and firm eternal confidence that you cannot be defeated. The lazy and cowardly have no place in this game.

References

Ball and bat games
Team sports
Russian games
Russian inventions
Sports originating in Russia